Viktor Ivanovich Kneib (born April 19, 1980 in Bratsk) is a Russian luger who has competed since the late 1990s. Competing in four Winter Olympics, he earned his best finish of 9th in the men's doubles event at Nagano in 1998.

Kneib's best finish at the FIL World Luge Championships was eighth in men's singles at Igls in 2007. His best finish at the FIL European Luge Championships was sixth in men's singles at Winterberg in 2006.

References

 
 
 Виктор Кнейб (Victor Kneyb) profile at Russian Luge Federation  (English translation)
 
 1998 luge men's doubles results
 2002 luge men's singles results
 2006 luge men's singles results

External links
 

1980 births
Living people
Russian male lugers
Olympic lugers of Russia
Lugers at the 1998 Winter Olympics
Lugers at the 2002 Winter Olympics
Lugers at the 2006 Winter Olympics
Lugers at the 2010 Winter Olympics
People from Bratsk
Sportspeople from Irkutsk Oblast